Rulingia  is a genus of flowering plants native to Australia and Madagascar. In 2011, all species were transferred to Commersonia with the exception of Rulingia cuneata, R. loxophylla, R. luteiflora and R. procumbens which have been transferred to the new genus Androcalva.

Species formerly placed in the genus included: 
Rulingia borealis (E.Pritz.) C.F.Wilkins (now Commersonia borealis (E.Pritz.) C.F.Wilkins & Whitlock)
Rulingia corylifolia Graham (now Commersonia corylifolia (Graham) C.F.Wilkins & Whitlock ) – hazel-leaved rulingia 
Rulingia craurophylla  F.Muell. (now Commersonia craurophylla (F.Muell.) F. Muell.) – brittle leaved rulingia 
Rulingia cuneata  Turcz. (now Androcalva cuneata (Turcz.) C.F.Wilkins & Whitlock)
Rulingia cygnorum  (Steud.) C.A.Gardner (now a synonym of Commersonia corniculata (Sm.) K.A.Sheph. & C.F.Wilkins)
Rulingia dasyphylla  (Andrews) Sweet (now Commersonia dasyphylla Andrews) – kerrawang    
Rulingia densiflora  (Turcz.) Benth. (now Commersonia densiflora (Turcz.) F.Muell.)
Rulingia grandiflora  Endl. (now Commersonia grandiflora (Endl.) C.F.Wilkins & Whitlock) 
Rulingia hermanniifolia  (J.Gay ex Kunth) Endl. (now Commersonia hermanniifolia J.Gay ex Kunth)
Rulingia loxophylla  F.Muell. (now Androcalva loxophylla (F.Muell.) C.F.Wilkins & Whitlock)
Rulingia luteiflora  E.Pritz. (now Androcalva luteiflora (E. Pritz.)C.F.Wilkins & Whitlock)
Rulingia madagascariensis Baker 
Rulingia magniflora  F.Muell.
Rulingia malvifolia  Steetz 
Rulingia parviflora  Endl. – small-flowered rulingia;
Rulingia platycalyx  Benth. 
Rulingia procumbens Maiden & Betche ((now Androcalva procumbens (Maiden & Betche) C.F.Wilkins & Whitlock)
Rulingia prostrata  Maiden & Betche – dwarf kerrawang
Rulingia rotundifolia  Turcz. – round-leaved rulingia
Rulingia rugosa  Steetz
Rulingia salviifolia  (Hook. ex Steetz) Benth.
Rulingia tratmannii  C.R.P.Andrews

References

Byttnerioideae
Historically recognized angiosperm genera
Malvaceae genera